1-Methylpsilocin is a tryptamine derivative which acts as a selective agonist for the 5-HT2C receptor (IC50 of 12 nM, vs 633 nM at 5-HT2A), and an inverse agonist at 5-HT2B (Ki of 38 nM). While 1-methylpsilocin does have higher affinity for 5-HT2C than 5-HT2A, it does produce a head-twitch response in mice that are dependent on 5-HT2A, so it is not entirely free of effects on 5-HT2A in vivo.  In contrast to psilocin, 1-methylpsilocin did not activate 5-HT1A receptors in mice.  1-Methylpsilocin has been investigated for applications such as treatment of glaucoma, OCD, and cluster headaches, as these conditions are amenable to treatment with psychedelic drugs but are not generally treated with such agents due to the hallucinogenic side effects they produce, which are considered undesirable. 1-Methylpsilocin therefore represents a potential alternative treatment to psilocin that may be less likely to produce hallucinogenic effects.

See also 
 2-Bromo-LSD
 CP-132,484
 O-4310

References 

Serotonin receptor agonists
Tryptamines
Hydroxyarenes
Dimethylamino compounds